The speckled dasyure (Neophascogale lorentzii), also known as the long-clawed marsupial mouse, is a member of the order Dasyuromorphia. It is an inhabitant of Papua, Indonesia and Papua New Guinea. It is the only member of the genus Neophascogale.

As its name suggested, its dark gray fur is speckled with long white hairs. It has short, powerful limbs with long claws on all toes, used to dig for grubs, worms, and similar prey.

References

External links
Image at ADW

Dasyuromorphs
Mammals of Papua New Guinea
Mammals of Western New Guinea
Mammals described in 1911
Taxobox binomials not recognized by IUCN
Marsupials of New Guinea